The 2003 Louisiana gubernatorial election was held on November 15, 2003 to elect the Governor of Louisiana. Incumbent Republican Governor Mike Foster was not eligible to run for re-election to a third term because of term limits established by the Louisiana Constitution.

As of 2021, this is the most recent Louisiana gubernatorial election in which the winner of the first round did not win the runoff.

Background 
Elections in Louisiana—with the exception of U.S. presidential elections—follow a variation of the open primary system called the jungle primary.  Candidates of any and all parties are listed on one ballot; voters need not limit themselves to the candidates of one party. Unless one candidate takes more than 50 percent of the vote in the first round, a run-off election is then held between the top two candidates, who may in fact be members of the same party. In this election, the first round of voting was held on October 4, 2003, and the runoff was held on November 15, 2003.

Candidates 
Democrats
Kathleen Blanco of Lafayette had led the high-profile growth of the state's tourism industry in her two terms as Lieutenant Governor.  Blanco ran as a conservative anti-abortion Democrat, hoping to appeal to enough Republican voters to enter the runoff over her Democratic rivals.
Attorney General Richard Ieyoub of Lake Charles had endorsements from labor and from the Louisiana Sheriffs Association, and had the most campaign contributions of any candidate.  His campaign strategy was to try to secure the votes of the Democrats' traditional base: labor, African-Americans, and teachers and professional groups.
Anthony Claude "Buddy" Leach, Jr., of Leesville and Lake Charles spent a large amount of his own money on the campaign. Leach ran a liberal populist campaign which included promises of minimum wage increases and of teacher raises and social programs funded by a new oil-processing tax.
Former state Senate President Randy Ewing of Quitman ran on a reform platform. Ewing was endorsed by New Orleans Mayor Ray Nagin in the primary, and had a significant base in north Louisiana.
Former state Senator J. E. Jumonville, Jr. of Ventress ran on a platform of cutting the severance tax as well as lowering the taxes on barrels of oil produced in state. He also took an uncharacteristic stance of a Democrat in advocating the placing of the Ten Commandments in all the parish courthouses and in the State Capitol. A former sixteen-year veteran of the state Senate, Jumonville self-funded his race but couldn't seem to gain traction as he started way too late in the race.

Republicans
 Bobby Jindal of Baton Rouge, the state Secretary of Health and Hospitals.  He received early support from departing Governor Murphy J. "Mike" Foster, Jr. His policy experience and educational background made him a natural fit among suburban and business-oriented Republicans, and he made a strong effort to reach out to rural conservatives.
Former state House Speaker Huntington B. Downer, Jr., of Houma, a brigadier general in the National Guard.  Downer had the support of several prominent Republican politicians, but his campaign never caught on with large sections of the public.
Public Service Commissioner Jack A. "Jay" Blossman, Jr., ran a series of provocative campaign ads designed to appeal to social conservatives, but he failed to gain much support in preliminary polls.  He dropped out of the race a week before the primary and endorsed Hunt Downer.

Campaign 
Departing Governor Foster was disqualified from succeeding himself for a third term by Louisiana's constitution, so the 2003 race was perceived as wide open and saw a large number of candidates enter the campaign.  The primary phase of the campaign was characterized by the large number of strong Democratic contenders.  Ieyoub was seen as one of the strongest Democratic candidates throughout the campaign, and only narrowly lost a slot in the runoff to Blanco, who had a strong base of support in the Acadian parishes and among women voters.  The efforts of Leach to appeal to the same base as Ieyoub led them to split the Democratic vote and to come in third and fourth.

The leading Republican candidate, by contrast, was chosen fairly early on.  Jindal took a commanding lead among Republican supporters early in the campaign, leaving Hunt Downer far behind.

In the runoff, Jindal received endorsements from the New Orleans Times-Picayune (the largest paper in Louisiana), New Orleans Mayor Nagin (who had supported Ewing in the primary but declined to endorse Blanco in the runoff), and outgoing Republican Governor Mike Foster.  Some political analysts believe that his narrow loss was partly due to racism. Other political analysts have blamed Jindal for his refusal to answer questions about his record brought up in several ads, which the Jindal campaign called "negative attack ads", the most effective of which denounced his health care plan. Still others note that a significant number of conservative Louisianans remained more comfortable voting for a conservative Democrat than for a Republican. The runoff between Bobby Jindal and Kathleen Blanco brought two 'firsts' for Louisiana political history.  If elected, Jindal would have been the United States' first Indian-American governor (which he did 4 years later). The victorious Blanco became Louisiana's first woman governor. She was also the second woman to have been lieutenant governor.

Results  

First voting round, October 4

Runoff, November 15

The race was close, with Blanco prevailing by almost 4%. Blanco won a huge majority of Louisiana's parishes, however, Jindal was able to keep Blanco's margin of victory in the single digits with a strong performance in Jefferson Parish and St. Tammany Parish, plus a narrow win in East Baton Rouge Parish. It was ultimately Orleans Parish home of New Orleans that insured a Blanco victory, though her 68.3% victory here was much smaller than Al Gore's 76% in the 2000 presidential election. This was the closest gubernatorial election since 1979, and there would not be another close gubernatorial race in Louisiana until 2019.

Sources 
 |Louisiana Secretary of State Elections Division.  Official Election Results Database

 Parent, Wayne.  Inside the Carnival:  Unmasking Louisiana Politics.  LSU Press, 2004.

 The New Orleans Times-Picayune.  "Jindal takes easy lead heading into runoff."  October 5, 2003.

2003
Gubernatorial
Louisiana